Northeastern Vermont Regional Hospital is a community, not for profit, acute care, critical access hospital. It is designated as a Baby Friendly hospital by the United Nations. It provides primary and preventive care, surgical and specialty services, inpatient and outpatient care and 24-hour emergency services.

Hospitals in Vermont
Buildings and structures in St. Johnsbury, Vermont